Christina Elm (born 16 June 1995) is a Danish handball player. She currently plays for København Håndbold and the Denmark women's national handball team.

References

1995 births
Living people
Danish female handball players
People from Greve Municipality
Sportspeople from Region Zealand